Beverly High School is one of two four-year public high schools in Beverly, Massachusetts, United States, the other being the smaller Northshore Academy. It has an enrollment of approximately 1,300 students and is accredited by the Massachusetts Department of Education and by the New England Association of Schools and Colleges.

The staff consists of a Principal, three assistant principals, an Athletic Director, six Guidance Counselors and about a hundred teachers including six department heads. The school mascot is the Beverly High Panthers.

Academics
BHS offers three foreign languages, French, Spanish, and German. It also offers ASL (American Sign Language). The school also offers 12 advanced placement courses. Over 90% of graduating seniors enroll in two or four year colleges.

Demographics

Extracurricular activities

Athletics

Beverly High School is a member of M.I.A.A with athletes participating in the Northeastern Conference. Athletics are open to all students at Beverly High School during Fall, Winter and Spring seasons.

Fall Sports
 Boys Cross Country
 Girls Cross Country
 Football
 Girls Volleyball
 Field Hockey
 Boys Soccer
 Girls Soccer
 Golf
 Football Cheerleading
Winter Sports
 Boys Basketball
 Girls Basketball
 Boys Indoor Track
 Girls Indoor Track
 Swimming
 Gymnastics
 Boys Hockey
 Girls Hockey
 Wrestling
 Basketball Cheerleading
Spring Sports
 Baseball
 Softball
 Boys Lacrosse
 Girls Lacrosse
 Boys Spring Track
 Girls Spring Track
 Boys Tennis
 Girls Tennis
 Sailing
 Ultimate Frisbee

Men's Ice Hockey
Beverly High School has a rich history of men's ice hockey. The Panthers won a division II State Championship in 2014 against Medfield 2-1 before an estimated 8,000 fans at TD Garden. That season ended with a 22-1-1 record.

Football
Beverly High School has played rival Salem High School on Thanksgiving  since 1891, making it one of the longest high school football rivalries in the country.  The 100th game in 1998 attracted over 11,000 fans to Hurd Stadium.  The overall record has BHS winning 54–51–7.

In 2010, the team won the Division III State Championship by defeating heavily favored and undefeated Somerset High School by a score of 28-20. Beverly overcame a 20-7 halftime deficit, and rallied back to complete one of the biggest upsets in Massachusetts High School Playoff Football history.

In 2012, the Beverly Panthers varsity football team won the division 2A Super Bowl against Natick at Gillette Stadium, winning 28-21. This win gave them a perfect season of 13-0, the first in the high school's history.

Boys Basketball
Since the turn of the decade, the Beverly Panthers varsity boys basketball team has enjoyed tremendous success, holding a record of 55-6 over the past three seasons. In the 2019-20 season, the team won a program record 21 games and captured the MIAA Division II North Championship over Belmont. During the 2021-22 season, the team matched the record with 21 wins of their own while holding a Boston Globe Top 10 ranking throughout the season.

Clubs
Beverly High School has various clubs, including:
North Shore Science League (3rd place overall for 2011'-2012' & 2012'-2013') 
Math Team
Key Club
Video Game Club
Gender and Sexuality Alliance
Eco-Club
Best Buddies
Aegis
Anime Club
Habitat for Humanity
Paranormal Club
Model United Nations
Ski Club
Philosophy Club
Civil Discussions Club
Stage Right Drama Club
Peer Leaders
Robotics Team
Anti Furry Organization

Construction
In 2011 main construction of the new Beverly High School, still located at 100 Sohier Road, completed.  The old building has since been demolished and landscaping and site work has been completed, including the two new turf fields that were installed. 
The new high school has finished being built, and has been in use for over 5 years as of 2023

Solar panels
Installed in 1981, Beverly High School became the first school in the country to have solar panels. These 100 kW ground mounted panels were supplanted by 83 kW of roof mounted solar panels in 2011.
In 2022, the old solar panels were removed and a new solar panel array was added to the hill.

Notable alumni
 Eddy Duchin, piano player and band leader
 David Ferriero, 10th Head of the U.S. National Archives, since 2009
 Matt Hubbard, television writer, most notable for his work on 30 Rock
 Jack Leathersich, MLB pitcher for the Pittsburgh Pirates
 Alfred Marshall, founder of Marshalls
 Angela Miller, American Idol season 12 contestant

References

External links
 

Northeastern Conference
Schools in Beverly, Massachusetts
Public high schools in Massachusetts
1859 establishments in Massachusetts
Educational institutions established in 1859